Michael Millar (born April 28, 1965) is a Canadian retired professional ice hockey player. Millar was selected 110th overall by the Hartford Whalers in the 1984 NHL Entry Draft. As well as the Whalers, he also played for the Washington Capitals, Boston Bruins, and Toronto Maple Leafs. Millar was born in St. Catharines, Ontario.

Millar played 10 seasons in the Deutsche Eishockey Liga and one in National League A between 1991 and 2002.

Career statistics

External links

Profile at hockeydraftcentral.com

1965 births
Living people
Baltimore Skipjacks players
Binghamton Whalers players
Boston Bruins players
Brantford Alexanders players
Canadian ice hockey right wingers
ECH Chur players
ESV Kaufbeuren players
Frankfurt Lions players
GEC Nordhorn players
Hamburg Crocodiles players
Hamilton Steelhawks players
Hartford Whalers draft picks
Hartford Whalers players
Ice hockey people from Ontario
Kassel Huskies players
Maine Mariners players
Newmarket Saints players
REV Bremerhaven players
Sportspeople from St. Catharines
Toronto Maple Leafs players
Washington Capitals players
Canadian expatriate ice hockey players in Germany
Canadian expatriate ice hockey players in Switzerland